Kenji Sahara (佐原 健二 Sahara Kenji) (born 14 May 1932) is a Japanese actor. He was born in Kawasaki City, Kanagawa. His birth name is Masayoshi Kato (加藤 正好 Katō Masayoshi). Initially he used the name Tadashi Ishihara before changing it when he secured the lead role in Rodan (1956).

Selected filmography
Sahara did a lot of work for the Toho Company, the studio that so far has produced 28 Godzilla movies.  He appeared in more of the Godzilla series than any other actor.

Also, he is the actor who was often relied on in most of the films by Directors Ishiro Honda and Eiji Tsuburaya.

He has appeared in many supporting roles.

Sahara is famous as a mainstay of Toho special-effects movies and the Ultraman series.

 Farewell Rabaul (1954)
 Godzilla (1954) – as Young Lover on the Sound
 Yuki No Koi (1955) – (credited as Tadashi Ishihara)
 Seifuku No Otome Tachi (1955) – as Hideya Fujiwara (credited as Tadashi Ishihara)
 Aoi Me (1956) – as Jirô Hayashi (credited as Tadashi Ishihara)
 Street of Shame (1956)
 Godzilla, King of the Monsters! (1956) – as Man on Boat
 Norihei No Daigaku (1956) – (credited as Tadashi Ishihara)
 People of Tokyo, Goodbye (1956) – (credited as Tadashi Ishihara)
 Rodan (1956) – as Shigeru Kawamura (credited as Kenji Sawara)
 Yoru no kamome (1957)
 Meshiro Sanpei monogatari (1957) – as Otsuka
 Zoku Sazae-san (1957)
 Hikage no musume (1957)
 Daigaku no samurai tachi (1957) – as Yamada
 The Mysterians (1957) – as Joji Atsumi
 Song for a Bride (1958)
 The Badger Palace (1958)
 Kiuchi yasuto (1958)
 Anzukko (1958)
 The H-Man (1958) – as Dr. Masada
 The Young Beast (1958)
 Zokuzoku salaryman shussetai koki (1958)
 Josei S.O.S. (1958)
 Otona niwa wakaranai: Seishun hakusho (1958)
 Salaryman jikkai (1959)
 Onna gokoro (1959)
 Gokigen musume (1959)
Mothra (1961) as Helicopter Pilot
Gorath (1962) as Saiki, Vice Captain of Ôtori
King Kong vs. Godzilla (1962) as Kazuo Fujita
Matango (1963) as Senzō Koyama
Atragon (1963) as Umino, Journalist/Mu Agent
Mothra vs. Godzilla (1964) as Jiro Torahata, a corrupt business tycoon
Ghidorah, the Three-Headed Monster (1964)
Frankenstein Conquers the World (1965) as a Soldier
None but the Brave (1965) as Cpl. Fujimoto
War of the Gargantuas (1966) as Dr. Yuzo Majida
Son of Godzilla (1967) as Morio
Destroy All Monsters (1968) as Nishikawa, Moon Base Commander
All Monsters Attack (1969) as Kenichi Mitsuki
Space Amoeba (1970) as Makoto Obata
Kage Gari Hoero Taihō (1972)
Godzilla vs. Mechagodzilla (1974) as Ship Captain
Karafuto 1945 Summer Hyosetsu no mon (1974) as Toshikazu Okaya
Terror of Mechagodzilla (1975) as General Segawa
Godzilla vs. King Ghidorah (1991) as Minister Takayuki Segawa
Godzilla vs. Mechagodzilla II (1993) as Minister Takayuki Segawa
Godzilla vs. SpaceGodzilla (1994) as Minister Takayuki Segawa
Hitman (1998) as Tsukamoto, a sleazy and notorious ex-yakuza boss who is assassinated by the King of Killers at the beginning of the film
Godzilla: Final Wars (2004) as Hachiro Jinguji

Sahara was also the lead in the first of the Ultra series, Ultra Q. He also appeared in a number of subsequent Ultra series, including:

Ultra Q (1966)- as Jun Manjoume
Ultra Seven (1967–1968) - as Takenaka Jinguji
Return of Ultraman (1971–1972) - as Takenaka Jinguji
Ultraman 80 (1980–1981) - as Dr. Jono
Ultraman Nexus (2004–2005) - as Togo
Ultraman Mebius (2006–2007) - as Takenaka Jinguji

His latest Ultraman appearance was in the 2008 Ultraman movie, Superior Ultraman 8 Brothers. He also made a cameo in episodes 47 and 48 of Sonic X, being the voice of Dr. Atsumi.

References

External links

 Biondi, Robert. Satoko Yoshimaru & Takahiko Mamiya (trans.) Winter 1997. "An Interview with Kenji Sahara: 40 Years of Keeping Godzilla at Bay", Kaiju Fan Online. Originally published in Kaiju Fan.

1932 births
Living people
Japanese male film actors
People from Kawasaki, Kanagawa